Eibelstadt is a town in the district of Würzburg, in Bavaria, Germany.

Geography
Eibelstadt is situated among vineyards on the right bank of the Main, 10 km southeast of Würzburg.

History
The city was founded in 787 in the time of Charles the Great. In 1434 German Emperor Sigismund bestowed municipal rights after the civilians had supported his war against the Hussites.
In the course of an administrative reform in Bavaria today's municipality was built in 1818.

Population dynamics

 1970: 2.023 
 1987: 2.279 
 2000: 2.838 
 2005: 2.886
 2010: 2.813
 2015: 3.022

Politics
Heinz Koch (SPD) has been the mayor of Eibelstadt 1990-2014. Since 2014 Markus Schenk (CSU) is the mayor.

City council
The 14 seats of the city council are distributed among the parties as follows:
CSU 7 seats
SPD 4 seats
Alliance 90/The Greens 4 seats
FDP 1 seat

(as of March 2020)

Coat of arms
The coat of arms consists of a half of a black lion with a golden crown. He grasps a rounded grape-vine with leaves and blue grapes in his pawns.

Sights and culture

Sights
completely preserved city wall (including the "Kereturm" (tower) from 1573)
city square with a golden Marian column
baroque building which used to be the location of the "Würzburger Domkapitel" (Würzburg Cathedral chapter)
Church St. Nikolaus

Museums
Museum of local history
City archive

Music
Two male choirs (ATGV and Liederkranz), one female choir (Allgemeiner Turn- und Gesangverein Eibelstadt), two mixed choirs (Heart and Soul; Sound of Downtown) as well as a two traditional bands.

Economy & Public transport

Economy
In 1998 927 people were subject to social contribution, out of which 23 people were working in agriculture, 169 in industry, 274 in commerce and 153 people in other areas.
There are six businesses in the building sector and 62 in agriculture. For agriculture,  were in use, including  for vineyards.

Public transport
The city is located at the Bundesstraße B 13, approximately 2 km from the highway exit "Würzburg-Randersacker" of the Autobahn A3.

Education
Kindergarten including a nursery school
Elementary school: 11 teachers and 274 students
Library
Higher education available in Ochsenfurt and Würzburg.

Notable citizens
Maximilian Englert - Crown Prince of Eibelstadt

References

Würzburg (district)